A piste is a marked ski run or path down a mountain for snow skiing, snowboarding, or other mountain sports.

This European term is French ("trail", "track") and synonymous with 'trail', 'slope', or 'run' in North America. The word is pronounced using a long "e" sound so that it rhymes with "beast".

North Americans employ its common European antonym, 'off piste', to describe backcountry skiing, especially when referring to skiing outside officially approved areas of a ski resort.


Construction 
Pistes are not naturally occurring features, and must be created through human means. This can be done by "clearing" (removing the trees only) or by "grading" (clearing followed by reshaping of the surface by machines like graders).

Maintenance

Pistes are usually maintained using tracked vehicles known as snowcats to compact or "groom" the snow to even out trail conditions, remove moguls, and redistribute snow to extend the ski season. Natural snow is often augmented with snow making machines and snow reserves, early in the season or when the snowpack is low, and to ensure the snow lasts throughout the season.

Ratings
Typically, grading is done by the resort, and grades are relative to other trails within that resort. As such, they are not classified to an independent standard; although they are likely to be roughly similar, skiers should be cautious about assuming that grades in two different resorts are absolutely equivalent.

North America, Australia and New Zealand 

In North America, Australia and New Zealand, a color–shape rating system is used to indicate the comparative difficulty of trails (otherwise known as slopes or pistes).

The steepness of ski trails is usually measured by grade (as a percentage) instead of degree angle. In general, beginner slopes (green circle) are between 6% and 25%. Intermediate slopes (blue square) are between 25% and 40%. Difficult slopes (black diamond) are 40% and up. However, this is just a general "rule of thumb". Although slope gradient is the primary consideration in assigning a trail difficulty rating, other factors come into play. A trail will be rated by its most difficult part, even if the rest of the trail is easy. Ski resorts assign ratings to their own trails, rating a trail compared only with other trails at that resort. The resort may take into consideration the width of the trail, sharpest turns, terrain roughness, the direction of the fall line, and whether the trail is groomed regularly.

Europe 

In Europe, pistes are classified by a color-coded system. The actual color system differs in parts for each country, although in all countries blue (easy), red (intermediate) and black (expert) are used. Shapes are often not used, sometimes all ratings are circles as being defined in the basic rules of the German Skiing Association DSV. The three basic color codes of the DSV have been integrated into the national standards DIN 32912 in Germany and ÖNORM S 4610 f in Austria.

In Scandinavia, a similar system is used with the addition of shapes, simplifying the identification of snow covered signs (see table below).

Slopes marked green, blue or red are groomed in all countries; blacks are groomed in Italy, Austria, Switzerland and Scandinavian resorts, while in France most black slopes are not groomed, but some are. All other classifications are generally not groomed. Sometimes slopes are marked on piste maps as dotted or as dashed lines, this also signifies that the slope is not groomed.

Alpine slope classification in Europe is less rigidly tied to slope angle than in North America. A lower angle slope may be classified as more difficult than a steeper slope if it requires better skiing ability because, for example, it is narrower, requires carrying speed through flatter sections or controlling speed through sharp hairpin turns, or features off-camber slope angles or exposed rock.

Scandinavia
In Norway, Sweden and Finland, a system is used with similar colours as elsewhere in Europe, but with shapes as well.

Japan 
Japan uses a color-coded system, but shapes do not usually accompany them. Some resorts, mainly those catering to foreigners, use the North American or European color-coding system, adding to the confusion. The usual ratings are:

Japan has more than 1000 ski areas (115 in Nagano Prefecture alone), many of them small and family-oriented, so comparisons between slope classifications in Japan and "equivalent" slopes in Europe or North America can be misleading.

See also
Cross-country skiing trail
Dry ski slope
Night skiing
Snow road

References

Ski areas and resorts
Skiing equipment